The Kharasavey gas field is a natural gas field located in the Yamal Peninsula. It was discovered in 1966. Gazprom intends to start production in 2023, requiring a new pipeline to join the Yamal–Europe pipeline.

References

Natural gas fields in Russia
Natural gas fields in the Soviet Union